John Albert Stevenson (February 29, 1848 – August 6, 1879) was a farmer and political figure in Manitoba. He represented Pembina in 1879 in the Legislative Assembly of Manitoba until he died in office.

He was born in Scott Township, Ontario, the son of Robert Stevenson, a native of Ireland.

References 

1848 births
Year of death missing
Members of the Legislative Assembly of Manitoba